MidCentral District Health Board (MidCentral DHB or MCDHB) was a district health board that provided healthcare in the Manawatū region of New Zealand. The DHB covers the Manawatu District, Palmerston North City, Tararua District, Horowhenua District, and the Ōtaki ward of the Kapiti Coast District. In July 2022, the MidCentral DHB was merged into the national health service Te Whatu Ora.

History
The MidCentral District Health Board, like most other district health boards, came into effect on 1 January 2001 established by the New Zealand Public Health and Disability Act 2000.

On 1 July 2022, the MidCentral DHB and the other district health boards were disestablished, with Te Whatu Ora (Health New Zealand) assuming their former functions and operations including hospitals and health services. The MidCentral DHB was brought under Te Whatu Ora's Central division.

Geographic area
The area covered by the MidCentral District Health Board is defined in Schedule 1 of the New Zealand Public Health and Disability Act 2000 and based on territorial authority and ward boundaries as constituted as at 1 January 2001. The area can be adjusted through an Order in Council.

Facilities 
Palmerston North Hospital is the DHB's main hospital, and serves as the major trauma centre for the DHB area.

Governance
The initial board was fully appointed. Since the 2001 local elections, the board has been partially elected (seven members) and in addition, up to four members get appointed by the Minister of Health. The minister also appoints the chairperson and deputy-chair from the pool of eleven board members.

The current board was sworn in on 9 December 2019, following the 2019 local elections. Brendan Duffy, a former mayor of the Horowhenua District, chairs the board.

Demographics 

MidCentral DHB served a population of 174,993 at the 2018 New Zealand census, an increase of 12,429 people (7.6%) since the 2013 census, and an increase of 16,152 people (10.2%) since the 2006 census. There were 65,580 households. There were 85,575 males and 89,415 females, giving a sex ratio of 0.96 males per female. The median age was 38.8 years (compared with 37.4 years nationally), with 34,602 people (19.8%) aged under 15 years, 35,463 (20.3%) aged 15 to 29, 73,803 (42.2%) aged 30 to 64, and 31,122 (17.8%) aged 65 or older.

Ethnicities were 80.1% European/Pākehā, 20.6% Māori, 4.4% Pacific peoples, 7.5% Asian, and 2.4% other ethnicities. People may identify with more than one ethnicity.

The percentage of people born overseas was 16.0, compared with 27.1% nationally.

Although some people objected to giving their religion, 50.5% had no religion, 35.9% were Christian, 1.1% were Hindu, 0.8% were Muslim, 0.7% were Buddhist and 3.2% had other religions.

Of those at least 15 years old, 24,855 (17.7%) people had a bachelor or higher degree, and 30,177 (21.5%) people had no formal qualifications. The median income was $28,200, compared with $31,800 nationally. 18,015 people (12.8%) earned over $70,000 compared to 17.2% nationally. The employment status of those at least 15 was that 65,634 (46.8%) people were employed full-time, 20,370 (14.5%) were part-time, and 6,120 (4.4%) were unemployed.

Hospitals

Public hospitals

 Palmerston North Hospital in Roslyn, Palmerston North has 354 beds and provides mental health, children's health, maternity, surgical, psychogeriatric, medical and geriatric services.
 Horowhenua Health Centre in Levin, Horowhenua has 28 beds and provides geriatric, maternity and medical services.

Private hospitals

 Crest Hospital in Papaioea, Palmerston North has 30 beds and provides surgical and medical services.
 Te Papaioea Birthing Centre in Roslyn, Palmerston North  has 12 beds and provides maternity services.
 Dannevirke Community Hospital in Dannevirke, Tararua  has 11 beds and provides maternity and medical services.
 Arohanui Hospice in Roslyn, Palmerston North has 11 beds and provides medical services.

Notes

References

District health boards in New Zealand
Manawatū-Whanganui
2001 establishments in New Zealand
2022 disestablishments in New Zealand